Celebrating 50 Glorious Years is a 2-disc compilation album by the comedy duo Hamish & Andy.It features segments included on their radio show between 2008 and 2010.

At the ARIA Music Awards of 2011, the album won ARIA Award for Best Comedy Release.

Track listings

Disc 1
 Megaphone
 The Double Up Blast from the Past
 The Old Internet
 Spying
 Drunk Gorillas
 Apple Store Dad
 Chilean Miners
 Big Dog Genitals
 The Treadmill Saga
 Cane Toads
 Criminal Mastermind - Lotto Ticket
 Flying Cars
 Andy Loses His Front Teeth
 Ultimate 'I Told You So'
 Another Injury
 Cow Man
 The Tooth Fairy
 Horgs' Invention
 K-Rudd's Plan
 The Breast Rest
 Fish & Chips Password
 Eating Special Things
 Swim-Up Bar
 Recruiting For Santa
 The Vague Out
 John Stamos
 Old Signatures
 The Ultimate Chick Flick
 Misdirected Text Message
 Andy's Cyborg
 Swine Flu
 Cyclone Hamish
 Andy's Potty Mouth
 Bad Present
 Cheese Twisties
 Skip Scavengers
 Lady Fingers
 David Attenborough
 Baha Men the Musical
 Mobile Phone Use
 Baby Showers
 Ordour Eating Upholstery
 Poor Man's Version
 Family Suggestions
 Sexy Cricket
 Fake Names

Disc 2
 High Level Perving
 Hamish's Top 40 CD
 Take The Snake Debate
 Andy's Mum's Message
 Antiques Roadshow
 Who's Milhouse, Who's Bart
 Scary Puppets
 EA Sports
 Criminal Mastermind - Sydney Roosters
 A Dog in the School
 Turtle Weapon
 Randy Russell Brand
 Heidi Klum's Body
 Andy Made It
 Girlfriend Holiday
 Easter Bonnet Parades
 Energy Company
 Blast From The Past - Dirt Bike
 Hamish Revisits Scotland
 Futuristic Toilet
 Baby Names
 The Greatest Prank Ever
 Car Steering
 Goodbye My Google
 Nicknames
 Diamond Scrimping
 Teaching Kids
 Pete Helliar Double Bluff
 Hamish's Weight
 Adobe Stitch Up
 Bad Smell
 Door Alarm
 Sick Voices
 The Big Pineapple
 Love Knows No Age
 Pants Off Jack
 Whitney Houston
 Moving Out Present
 Large Hadron Collider
 Caravan of Courage 2
 Van Attachment
 Fred Basset In the Future
 Unessential Bits

Charts

Weekly charts

Year-end charts

Certifications

See also
Hamish & Andy (radio show)

References

2010 compilation albums
ARIA Award-winning albums
Hamish & Andy albums